Bience Philomina Gawanas (born 1956) is a Namibian lawyer. She was appointed in January 2018 as Special Adviser on Africa for the United Nations after having served as Commissioner for Social Affairs at the African Union Assembly of Heads of State and Government, from 2002 to 2012. She was a Commissioner on the Public Service Commission in Namibia from 1991 to 1996, and an Ombudswoman in the Namibian Government from 1996 to 2003. She has also been a lecturer in Gender Law at the University of Namibia, Director of the Board of the Central Bank of Namibia, and involved in many non-governmental organizations including Secretary-General of the Namibian National Women's Organization and patron of Namibian Federation of Persons with Disabilities. As Chairperson of the Law Reform Commission she oversaw the passage of the Married Persons' Equality Act. The commission also did extensive work on Rape Acts and other important laws that were eventually passed after her time.

Early life and education
Bience is the daughter of Philemon Gawanab and Hilde Rheiss. She attended secondary school at St Theresa Catholic school in Tses, ǁKaras Region, southern Namibia. From Tses she went to University of the Western Cape (UWC) in Cape Town, South Africa, to study law; Catholic sponsors helped her resist the pressure of apartheid officials to switch careers from law to nursing. She was expelled from UWC after the Soweto uprisings in 1976.

After her expulsion she became an active member of SWAPO Youth League in Namibia and a teacher. She went into exile and lived in Zambia, Angola and Cuba. In 1981 the International Labour Organization sponsored her as an intern at their headquarters and subsequently on a labour law study. After this Africa Educational Trust sponsored her through a law degree at University of Warwick, UK. She graduated in 1987 and qualified as a barrister at Lincoln's Inn, London in 1988.

Namibia was occupied illegally by South Africa until 1990. "When I decided to study law, a white schools inspector told me that as a black child my intelligence was lower than that of a white child and that maybe law was not meant for me," she said to one interviewer. "Today I am a lawyer and I have proved that intelligence has got nothing to do with a person's colour."

Gawanas's interest in law was sparked after her beloved elder brother Jeka was picked up by whites and beaten to death while hitch-hiking, and police decided it was a "road accident". Her practical training included work with Lord Tony Gifford on human rights cases such as the "Birmingham Six" appeal of alleged bombers who were later exonerated. Throughout her exile, Gawanas continued to campaign for Namibia's freedom from South African rule.

In 1988 she travelled to Zambia to visit her daughter and was detained by SWAPO. Over an extended period the movement detained many thousands of Namibians as part of a "spy scare". These allegations were never proved despite months of solitary confinement and torture. Gawanas later became one of the first Namibians to return alive from the "dungeons" in Lubango, Southern Angola, in 1989, some months before many other surviving detainees were released. By July 1989, she and her daughter were repatriated by the United Nations and were back on Namibian soil.

Career
Her first job back in Namibia from exile was with advocate Anton Lubowski, which ended when apartheid agents murdered Lubowski on his front doorstep in an unsuccessful attempt to destabilize the 1989 UN-supervised elections. She then worked as with the public-interest Legal Assistance Centre until 1991 when she was appointed by Parliament to the Public Service Commission of Namibia. Her work there included extensive rebalancing of the Namibian civil service. President Sam Nujoma appointed her Ombudsman, on recommendation of the Judicial Services Commission, in 1996 and she served there, investigating and resolving complaints of maladministration at all levels, until 2003. She also served as Executive Secretary of the African Ombudsman Association.

In July 2003 Gawanas was elected by the African Heads of State as Commissioner of Social Affairs for the African Union Commission, based in Addis Ababa, Ethiopia. She has been seeking to increase the profile of social development issues on the continental agenda. She was elected for two terms, in 2003 and 2008, and after completing her second term in October 2012, she returned to Namibia where she became Special Advisor to the Minister of Health and Social Services.

In January 2018 Gawanas was appointed Special Adviser on Africa for the United Nations by UN Secretary‑General António Guterres. She serves at the level of Under-Secretary-General.

In May 2020, Gawanas was selected to serve on the first Board of Trustees of the International Planned Parenthood Federation (IPPF) following their governance reform.

Private life
Bience Gawanas is the aunt of politician Sade Gawanas.

Awards
The University of the Western Cape awarded her a Doctor legum honoris causa at their September 2012 graduation ceremony.

References

External links
Ademola article at AllAfrica.com
Gawanas, Bience P. Gawanas bio

African Union Commission members
People from ǁKaras Region
Alumni of the University of Warwick
University of the Western Cape alumni
Academic staff of the University of Namibia
1956 births
Living people
Namibian expatriates in South Africa
SWAPO politicians
Under-Secretaries-General of the United Nations